Newdow v. Rio Linda Union School District (also known as Newdow v. Carey), Nos. 05-17257,  05-17344, and 06-15093, was a United States Court of Appeals for the Ninth Circuit decision that upheld the constitutionality of the teacher-led recitation of the Pledge of Allegiance by students in public schools. The 2–1 majority found that the recitation did not constitute an establishment of religion prohibited by the United States Constitution.

It was an appeal from the Eastern District of California, which ruled that the recitation of the Pledge of Allegiance in public school is unconstitutional based on the Ninth Circuit's ruling that the words "under God" violate the Establishment Clause of the United States Constitution in Newdow v. United States Congress in 2002. That case was later appealed to the U.S. Supreme Court and overturned on an issue of standing in Elk Grove Unified School District v. Newdow in 2004.

In the new case, the plaintiffs were three unnamed families.  The defendants were Rio Linda Union School District, the United States as a Defendant-Intervenor and a group of defendant-intervenors, including lead intervenor John Carey, who sought to preserve the current wording of the Pledge.  The private defendant-intervenors were represented by the Becket Fund for Religious Liberty.  The Court of Appeals consolidated the defendants' three different appeals for briefing and argument.

The Court heard oral argument in the case on December 4, 2007 where the petitioner Michael Newdow argued for plaintiffs. Deputy Assistant Attorney General Gregory Katsas argued for the United States, Terence Cassidy argued for the Rio Linda Union School District, and Kevin Hasson of the Becket Fund argued for the private intervenor-defendants. A decision was handed down on March 11, 2010.

References

External links
 Text of Newdow v. Rio Linda USD. Ninth Circuit Court of Appeals.
 Audio of oral argument. "Media for Case: Newdow v. John Carey, No. 05-17257". Ninth Circuit Court of Appeals.

Establishment Clause case law
United States education case law
United States Court of Appeals for the Ninth Circuit cases
2008 in United States case law
Pledge of Allegiance
2010 in religion
2010 in education
Education in Sacramento County, California